Andrew Logan is an American performer, songwriter, and director.

Solo album
Logan released his debut solo album, Show Me Your Heart, on Motown Records in 1993.

Work
 Fall Out Boy, Young Wild Things US Tour, Director 
 Fall Out Boy, Honda Civic US Tour, Director
 Panic! at the Disco, Nothing Rhymes with Disco US Tour, Director
 Toni Braxton, Revealed at the Flamingo Hilton, Las Vegas, Director
 Dave Koz, A Smooth Jazz Christmas, US Tour, Director
 Toni Braxton, Libra US Tour, Director
 Dave Koz, At the Movies US Tour, Director
 Nobody's Angel, Can't Help Myself US Tour, Director
 Toni Braxton, "Talking in His Sleep" Music Video, Director
 Nights on Broadway II & III, Musical Director/Vocal Arranger
 Garth Brooks, "Snow In July", Writer.
 Paula Abdul, "Ooh La La La", Producer.
 Dakota Moon, "Dakota Moon", Album Producer.
 Aaron Carter, "A Dream About You", Producer.
 Orfeh, What Do You Want from Me, Writer/Producer/Co-Executive Producer.

Director

2008/2009 HOW SWEET THE SOUND                                          U.S Tour
FALL OUT BOY			                            "Young Wild Things Tour"/U.S Tour
TONI BRAXTON 			                           "Revealed" Flamingo Hilton, Las Vegas
PANIC! AT THE DISCO	 	                           "Nothing Rhymes With Disco"/ U.S Tour"
2010 STELLAR AWARDS		                 "Featuring Donald Lawrence & The Atlanta West Pentecostal Choir"
2010 NAACP AWARDS	                                             "Mary Mary Performance"
MARY MARY			                                      "The Sound"/U.S Tour"
TONI BRAXTON 		 	                                     "Libra Tour"/ U.S Tour"
FALL OUT BOY			                                    "Honda Civic Tour"/U.S Tour"			
DAVE KOZ			                                  
"A Smooth Jazz Christmas"/U.S Tour"
"At The Movies"/U.S Tour"
"Greatest Hits"/U.S Tour"
TONI BRAXTON			                                  
"Fox’s New Year's Eve"/Fox T.V."
"NBA All Star Game"/ Half Time Show TNT"
"The White Party"/Palm Springs"
NOBODY'S ANGEL		                                          "Can't Help Myself"/ U.S Tour"	
DAKOTA MOON			                                      "A Place To Land"/U.S Tour"
NIGHTS ON BROADWAY	                       2 & 3 /Caesars, Atlantic City(Musical Director/Vocal Arranger)	      
                                                                     
MUSIC VIDEOS
DENNIS LOGAN			                                     "The Whole Things Going Down"	
TONI BRAXTON			                               "Talking In His Sleep"/Revealed Las Vegas"
DONALD LAWRENCE                                         "Let The Word Do The Work"/ How Sweet The Sound"  
                        
INDUSTRIALS
Lea Michele, "Dove's Favorite Things"
LEXUS, TOYOTA, AXE BODY SPRAY, DOVE, WHIRLPOOL, BURGER KING

References

American male songwriters
American rhythm and blues musicians
American rock musicians
American male pop singers
Motown artists
Living people
Year of birth missing (living people)
American gay musicians
American LGBT singers
American LGBT songwriters
Gay singers
Gay songwriters